Sequeiros e Gradiz is a civil parish in the municipality of Aguiar da Beira, Portugal. It was formed in 2013 by the merger of the former parishes Sequeiros and Gradiz. The population in 2011 was 421, in an area of 23.92 km2.

References

Freguesias of Aguiar da Beira